George R. Johnson (October 19, 1929 – September 28, 1973) was an American politician who served as a Republican member of the Pennsylvania House of Representatives for the Delaware County district from 1967 to 1968 and the 166th district from 1969 to 1972.

Early life and education
Johnson was born in West Haven, Connecticut and graduated from Haverford High School in Haverford, Pennsylvania.  He received a B.S. degree from St. Joseph's College in 1952 and an LL.B. from Temple University Law School in 1955.

Career
Johnson was elected to the Pennsylvania House of Representatives for the Delaware County district and served from 1967 to 1968. After 1968, districts in Pennsylvania were changed from county to specific districts. Johnson was elected to the newly formed 166th district in 1969 and served until 1972. 

He was not a candidate for reelection to the House for the 1973 term.

Death and interment
Johnson died in Chester, Pennsylvania and was interred at the Saints Peter and Paul cemetery in Springfield, Pennsylvania.

References

1929 births
1973 deaths
20th-century American politicians
Republican Party members of the Pennsylvania House of Representatives
Pennsylvania lawyers
People from West Haven, Connecticut
Saint Joseph's University alumni
Temple University Beasley School of Law alumni
20th-century American lawyers